"We've Gotta Find a Way Back to Love" is a song by Freda Payne from her 1973 album Reaching Out, written by the songwriting team of Holland–Dozier–Holland. It was later covered by Bonnie Pink and released as her third single on the Pure Sand label on June 28, 1996.

Track listing
a1. "We've Gotta Find a Way Back to Love" by Bonnie Pink
b1. "Living in the Dark" by Cokeberry

References

1996 singles
Bonnie Pink songs
1973 songs
Songs written by Holland–Dozier–Holland
Freda Payne songs